Kate Tenforde (née O'Neill; born July 29, 1980) is an American long-distance runner from Milton, Massachusetts.  She represented the United States in the 2004 Summer Olympics, competing in the 10,000 metres.

Amateur career
Tenforde ran cross country and track and field at Yale University, where she was a three-time NCAA runner-up in Cross Country, 5000 m (indoor), and 10,000 m (outdoor).   O'Neill earned All-American honors in both Cross Country and Outdoor track.  Her twin sister, Laura, was also an All-American at Yale.

Professional career
In 2004, after setting personal records in the 10,000 m and 5000 m, Tenforde finished third in the Olympic 10,000 m trials with a time of 32:07.25. This qualified her for the 2004 Summer Olympics. In Athens, she finished 21st with a time of 32:24.04.

Marathon
Tenforde later turned her focus to longer distance events, with an emphasis on the marathon.  She was coached by Terrence Mahon, who coaches notable American marathoners Deena Kastor, Ryan Hall, and Jen Rhines. She had a strong marathon debut at the Chicago Marathon, finishing third with a time of 2:36:15. In January 2008, she won the 2008 USA half-marathon championship (1:11:57) at the Aramco Houston Half-Marathon. Tenforde was a favorite at the 2008 U.S. Olympic Marathon Trials, but a knee injury forced her to drop out at mile 21.

In 2009 Tenforde trained in Palo Alto, California, and was the first American finisher at the 2009 London Marathon, with a time of  2:34:48.

In September 2014, Tenforde won the annual San Francisco J.P. Morgan Corporate Challenge 5k.

Personal 
Tenforde married former Stanford Cardinal runner Adam Tenforde on November 20, 2010.

Professional 
From 2010 through 2015, Tenforde worked as a coach and product manager for runcoach to share her running expertise with recreational runners across the country.  In 2016, she launched Beantown Running and began offering private coaching services to runners of all levels.

References

External links 
 
 
 
 
 

1980 births
Living people
American female long-distance runners
American female marathon runners
Olympic track and field athletes of the United States
Athletes (track and field) at the 2004 Summer Olympics
Yale Bulldogs women's track and field athletes
Yale Bulldogs women's cross country runners
People from Milton, Massachusetts
Sportspeople from Norfolk County, Massachusetts
21st-century American women